Turkey competed at the 1964 Winter Olympics in Innsbruck, Austria.

Alpine skiing

Men

Men's slalom

References
Official Olympic Reports
 Olympic Winter Games 1964, full results by sports-reference.com

Nations at the 1964 Winter Olympics
1964
1964 in Turkish sport